KAA Gent Ladies is the women's section of KAA Gent. It was founded in 1996 as Melle Ladies. In 2012 their name changed to AA Gent Ladies.

In 2017 the team won the Belgian Women's Cup for the first time.

Players

Current squad

Former players
  Samya Hassani 
  Nicky Evrard 
  Jassina Blom 
  Nina Stapelfeldt 
  Marie Minnaert 
  Rkia Mazrouai 
  Shari Van Belle
  Elena Dhont 
  Kassandra Missipo 
  Lyndsey Van Belle 
  Lenie Onzia  
  Chloë Vande Velde
  Elke Van Gorp
  Isabelle Iliano
  Heleen Jaques
  Silke Vanwynsberghe 
  Féli Delacauw

Head coaches 
  Dirk Decoen (2012–2013) 
  Dave Mattheus (2013–2022)
  Jorn Van Ginderdeuren (2022–)

Staff 
  Jorn Van Ginderdeuren (head coach)
  Angelo Gaytant (assistant coach)
  Bram Gettemans (Physical Coach)
  Gilles Dhont (goalkeeping coach)
  Nico Van den Branden (performance analyst)
  Pascal Bleys (Fitness coach)
  Anton Leurquain (physio)
  Hannelore Malfliet (Teamdoctor)

References

External links
Official website

Women's football clubs in Belgium
Association football clubs established in 1996
1996 establishments in Belgium
BeNe League teams
K.A.A. Gent
Sport in Ghent